In West Virginia folklore, the Mothman is a humanoid creature reportedly seen in the Point Pleasant area from November 15, 1966, to December 15, 1967. The first newspaper report was published in the Point Pleasant Register, dated November 16, 1966, titled "Couples See Man-Sized Bird ... Creature ... Something". The national press soon picked up the reports and helped spread the story across the United States. The source of the legend is believed to have originated from sightings of out-of-migration sandhill cranes or herons.

The creature was introduced to a wider audience by Gray Barker in 1970, and was later popularized by John Keel in his 1975 book The Mothman Prophecies, claiming that there were supernatural events related to the sightings, and a connection to the collapse of the Silver Bridge. The book was later adapted into a 2002 film, starring Richard Gere.

An annual festival in Point Pleasant is devoted to the Mothman legend.

History
On November 15, 1966, two young couples from Point Pleasant—Roger and Linda Scarberry, and Steve and Mary Mallette—told police they had seen a large white creature whose eyes "glowed red", standing at the side of the road near "the TNT area", the site of a former World War II munitions plant. Linda Scarberry described it as a "slender, muscular man" about seven feet tall with white wings, and said that she was unable to discern its face due to the hypnotic effect of its eyes. Distressed, the witnesses drove away at speed, and said that the creature flew after their car, making a screeching sound. It pursued them as far as Point Pleasant city limits.

During the next few days, other people reported similar sightings, after local newspapers reported it. Two volunteer firemen who saw it said it was a "large bird with red eyes". Mason County Sheriff George Johnson commented that he believed the sightings were due to an unusually large heron he termed a "shitepoke". Contractor Newell Partridge told Johnson that when he aimed a flashlight at a creature in a nearby field, its eyes glowed "like bicycle reflectors".  Additionally, he blamed buzzing noises from his television set and the disappearance of his German Shepherd dog on the creature. Wildlife biologist Robert L. Smith at West Virginia University told reporters that descriptions and sightings all fit the sandhill crane, a large American crane almost as tall as a man with a seven-foot wingspan featuring circles of reddish coloring around the eyes. The bird may have wandered out of its migration route, and therefore was unrecognized at first because it was not native to this region.

Due to the popularity of the Batman TV series at the time, the fictional superhero Batman and his rogues gallery were prominently featured in the public eye. While the villain Killer Moth did not appear in the show, the comic book influence of both him and Batman is believed by some to have influenced the coinage of the name “Mothman” in the local newspapers.

Following the December 15, 1967 collapse of the Silver Bridge and the death of 46 people, the incident gave rise to the legend and connected the Mothman sightings to the bridge collapse.

According to Georgian newspaper Svobodnaya Gruziya, Russian UFOlogists claim that Mothman sightings in Moscow foreshadowed the 1999 Russian apartment bombings.

The Mothman Prophecies (2002) is a major motion picture, loosely based on the 1975 book of the same name by John Keel.

In 2016, WCHS-TV published a photo purported to be of Mothman taken by an anonymous man while driving on Route 2 in Mason County.<ref name="WCHS">{{cite web|last1=Pierson|first1=Fallon|title=Man photographs creature that resembles legendary Mothman" of Point Pleasant|url=http://wchstv.com/news/local/man-photographs-creature-that-resembles-legendary-mothman-of-point-pleasant|website=WCHS-TV news|date=November 21, 2016|publisher=WCHS|access-date=18 January 2017}}</ref> Science writer Sharon A. Hill proposed that the photo showed "a bird, perhaps an owl, carrying a frog or snake away" and wrote that "there is zero reason to suspect it is the Mothman as described in legend. There are too many far more reasonable explanations."

Analysis
Folklorist Jan Harold Brunvand notes that Mothman has been widely covered in the popular press, some claiming sightings connected with UFOs, and others claiming that a military storage site was Mothman's "home". Brunvand notes that recountings of the 1966–67 Mothman reports usually state that at least 100 people saw Mothman with many more "afraid to report their sightings" but observed that written sources for such stories consisted of children's books or sensationalized or undocumented accounts that fail to quote identifiable persons. Brunvand found elements in common among many Mothman reports and much older folk tales, suggesting that something real may have triggered the scares and became woven with existing folklore. He also records anecdotal tales of Mothman supposedly attacking the roofs of parked cars occupied by teenagers.

Conversely, Joe Nickell says that a number of hoaxes followed the publicity generated by the original reports, such as a group of construction workers who tied flashlights to helium balloons. Nickell attributes the Mothman stories to sightings of barred owls, suggesting that the Mothman's "glowing eyes" were actually red-eye effect caused from the reflection of light from flashlights or other bright light sources. Benjamin Radford points out that the only report of glowing "red eyes,"  was secondhand, that of Shirley Hensley quoting her father. One of the prevailing hypotheses associated with the Mothman at the time of the original sightings was that it was a misidentified Sand Hill Crane, due primarily to the size of the bird as well as the "reddish flesh" around the crane's eyes. Daniel A. Reed examined the migration patterns and historically reported sightings of Sand Hill Cranes in the area of Point Pleasant and proposed that, in cases where eyeshine was not noted, it was statistically more likely that witnesses were seeing and misidentifying a Great Blue Heron instead.

According to University of Chicago psychologist David A. Gallo, 55 sightings of Mothman in Chicago during 2017 published on the website of self-described Fortean researcher Lon Strickler are "a selective sample". Gallo explains that "he's not sampling random people and asking if they saw the Mothmanhe's just counting the number of people that voluntarily came forward to report a sighting." According to Gallo, "people more likely to visit a paranormal-centric website like Strickler's might also be more inclined to believe in, and therefore witness the existence of, a 'Mothman'."

Some pseudoscience adherents (such as ufologists, paranormal authors, and cryptozoologists) claim that Mothman was an alien, a supernatural manifestation, or a previously unknown species of animal. In his 1975 book, Keel claimed that the Point Pleasant residents experienced precognitions including premonitions of the collapse of the Silver Bridge, UFO sightings, visits from inhuman or threatening men in black, and other phenomena.

Festival and statues
Point Pleasant held its first Annual Mothman Festival in 2002. The Mothman Festival began after brainstorming creative ways for people to visit Point Pleasant. The group organizing the event chose the Mothman to be the center of the festival due to its uniqueness, and as a way to celebrate its local legacy in the town.

According to the event organizer Jeff Wamsley, the average attendance for the Mothman Festival is an estimated 10–12 thousand people per year.
A 12-foot-tall metallic statue of the creature, created by artist and sculptor Bob Roach, was unveiled in 2003. The Mothman Museum and Research Center opened in 2005.Moran, Mark; Sceurman, Mark; Lake, Matt (2008). Weird U.S. The ODDyssey Continues – Your Travel Guide to America's Local Legends and Best Kept Secrets, p. 260. New York: Sterling Publishing Co., Inc.  The festival is held on the third weekend of every September, hosting guest speakers, vendor exhibits, pancake-eating contests, and hayride tours of locally notable areas.

See also
 Apparitional experience
 Belled buzzard
 Bogeyman
 Flatwoods monster
 Goatman (urban legend)
 Owlman
 The Mothman of Point Pleasant – a 2017 documentary film about Mothman
 Popobawa
 Spring-heeled Jack

References

Further reading
 Bullard, Stephan, et al. The Silver Bridge Disaster of 1967 (2012).  
 Coleman, L. Mothman and Other Curious Encounters. (2002). )
 Colvin, Andrew The Mothman's Photographer: The Work of an Artist Touched by the Prophecies of the Infamous Mothman (2007). 
 Colvin, Andrew The Mothman's Photographer II: Meetings With Remarkable Witnesses Touched by Paranormal Phenomena, UFOs, and the Prophecies of West Virginia's Infamous Mothman (2007). 
 Fear, Brad A Macabre Myth of a Moth-Man (2008) 
 Keel, John A. The Eighth Tower (1977). 
 Myers, Bill. Angel of Wrath: A Novel (2009). 
 Myres, Rau & Macklin The Little Giant Book of True Ghost Stories, pp. 166–170 (2001) 
 Ressel, Steve. Perverted Communion (2010). 
 Sergent, Jr., Donnie Mothman: The Facts Behind the Legend (2001) 
 Schmidt, W.L. Threads of Faithfulness (2013) 
 Wood, Jen A. Point Pleasant'' (2013)

External links
 
 

1966 in West Virginia
1967 in West Virginia
2016 in Virginia
American legendary creatures
Cryptozoology
Mothman
Point Pleasant, West Virginia
Supernatural legends